Allah Ditta (15 December 1932 – 20 March 2020) was a Pakistani pole vaulter who competed in two Olympic Games.

Born in Panjeri , Ditta first competed internationally at the 1956 Summer Olympics in Melbourne, Australia. Representing Pakistan, he finished in 15th place in the qualifying round of the pole vault event with a height of 4.00 metres. Two years later at the 1958 Asian Games in Tokyo, Japan, Ditta won the bronze medal in the pole vault. All three medalists cleared 4.20 metres which equalled the Asian Games record. At the 1960 Summer Olympics in Rome, Italy, he finished in 26th place in the qualifying round of the pole vault clearing the same height as four year previously. At the 1962 Asian Games in Jakarta, Indonesia, Ditta won bronze in the pole vault with a height of 4.10 metres.

References

1932 births
2020 deaths
Athletes from Gujarat
Pakistani male pole vaulters
Olympic athletes of Pakistan
Commonwealth Games competitors for Pakistan
Asian Games bronze medalists for Pakistan
Athletes (track and field) at the 1956 Summer Olympics
Athletes (track and field) at the 1960 Summer Olympics
Athletes (track and field) at the 1958 British Empire and Commonwealth Games
Athletes (track and field) at the 1962 British Empire and Commonwealth Games
Athletes (track and field) at the 1958 Asian Games
Athletes (track and field) at the 1962 Asian Games
Asian Games medalists in athletics (track and field)
Medalists at the 1958 Asian Games
Medalists at the 1962 Asian Games